The 2017–18 season is CSKA Sofia's 69th season in the Bulgarian A Football Group and their second consecutive participation after their administrative relegation in the third division due to mounting financial troubles. This article shows player statistics and all matches (official and friendly) that the club will play during the 2017–18 season.

Players

Squad stats

Players in/out

Summer transfers 

In:

Out:

Winter transfers 

In:

Out:

Pre-season and friendlies

Competitions

Parva Liga

Regular season

League table

Results summary

Results by round

Results

Championship round

League table

Results summary

Results by round

Results

Bulgarian Cup

See also 
PFC CSKA Sofia

References

External links 
CSKA Official Site

PFC CSKA Sofia seasons
Cska Sofia